The London Assembly is a 25-member elected body, part of the Greater London Authority, that scrutinises the activities of the Mayor of London and has the power, with a two-thirds super-majority, to amend the Mayor's annual budget and to reject the Mayor's draft statutory strategies. The London Assembly was established in 2000. It is also able to investigate other issues of importance to Londoners (most notably transport or environmental matters), publish its findings and recommendations, as well as make proposals to the Mayor.

Assembly Members
The Assembly comprises 25 Assembly Members elected using the additional member system of proportional representation, with 13 seats needed for a majority. Elections take place every four years, at the same time as for the Mayor. There are 14 geographical super-constituencies each electing one Member, with a further 11 members elected from a party list to make the total Assembly Members from each party proportional to the votes cast for that party across the whole of London using a modified D'Hondt allocation. A party must win at least 5% of the party list vote in order to win any seats. Members of the London Assembly have the post-nominal title "AM". The annual salary for a London Assembly Member is approximately £59,000.

Former Assembly Members
Since its creation in 2000, fifteen Assembly Members have subsequently been elected to the House of Commons: David Lammy, Meg Hillier, Diana Johnson and Florence Eshalomi for Labour; Andrew Pelling, Bob Neill, Angie Bray, Bob Blackman, Eric Ollerenshaw, Victoria Borwick, James Cleverly, Kit Malthouse, Kemi Badenoch and Gareth Bacon for the Conservatives; and Lynne Featherstone for the Liberal Democrats. One Assembly Member, Jenny Jones, was appointed to the House of Lords as the first life peer for the Green Party, and simultaneously sat in the Assembly until May 2016. Sally Hamwee, Graham Tope and Toby Harris were life peers elected to the Assembly, while Lynne Featherstone and Dee Doocey were appointed peers after leaving the Assembly. In addition, Val Shawcross, Assembly Member for Lambeth and Southwark was selected, but unsuccessful, as the Labour parliamentary candidate for the constituency of Bermondsey and Old Southwark at the 2010 general election, as was Navin Shah who stood for Labour in Harrow East in 2017. Andrew Dismore, Graham Tope, and the late Richard Tracey are all former MPs who were later elected to the Assembly. One Assembly Member – John Biggs, former AM for City and East – became the directly elected Mayor of Tower Hamlets in 2015 until 2022.

Structure of the Assembly
London Assembly elections have been held under the additional member system, with a set number of constituencies elected on a first-past-the-post system and a set number London-wide on a closed party list system. Terms are for four years, so despite the delayed 2020 election, which was held in 2021, the following election will be in 2024.

In December 2016, an Electoral Reform Bill was introduced which would have changed the election system to first-past-the-post. At the 2017 general election, the Conservative Party manifesto proposed changing how the Assembly is elected to first-past-the-post.

However, since the general election of 2017, which resulted in a hung Parliament with the Conservatives and the Democratic Unionist Party in a confidence and supply arrangement, no action has been taken with regard to the electoral arrangements of the London Assembly, and the 2020 election, delayed to 2021 due to the COVID-19 pandemic, was held on the current electoral system of AMS (constituencies and regional list)

On 12 December 2018, following Peter Whittle's departure from UKIP, he and David Kurten disbanded the UKIP grouping and formed the Brexit Alliance group.

In March 2019, following the departure of Tom Copley and Fiona Twycross to take up full-time Deputy Mayor roles, Murad Qureshi and Alison Moore replaced them as Labour Assembly Members. The end of the term in office for AMs was extended from May 2020 to May 2021, as no elections were being held during the COVID-19 pandemic.

List of current Assembly Members

List of chairs of the London Assembly

Committees
The Assembly has formed the following committees:

 Audit Panel, chaired by Neil Garratt
 Budget and Performance Committee, chaired by Peter Fortune
 Confirmation Hearings Committee 
 Economy Committee, chaired by Hina Bokhari
 Environment Committee, chaired by Zack Polanski
 Fire, Resilience and Emergency Planning Committee, chaired by Anne Clarke
 GLA Oversight Committee, chaired by Leonie Cooper
 Health Committee, chaired by Krupesh Hirani
 Housing Committee, chaired by Sem Moema
 Planning and Regeneration Committee, chaired by Sakina Sheikh
 Police and Crime Committee, chaired by Susan Hall
 Transport Committee, chaired by Siân Berry

The Police and Crime Committee was set up under the terms of the Police Reform and Social Responsibility Act 2011 in order to scrutinise the work of Mayor's Office for Policing and Crime, which replaced the Metropolitan Police Authority.

Result maps 
Note that these maps only show constituency results and not list results.

References

External links
 London Assembly
 London Assembly publications
 City Hall Labour
 Conservatives in the London Assembly
 London Assembly Liberal Democrats

 
Local government in London
Regional assemblies in England
2000 establishments in England